The Olive Hill C & O Depot is a historic Chesapeake & Ohio railway depot in Olive Hill, Kentucky which was listed on the National Register of Historic Places in 1992.

It was built in 1910, on the southern side of Railroad St., west of the junction with Plum St. in Olive Hill, in Prairie School style.

It was renovated for use as a First National Bank branch in 1989–1990.

References

Railway stations on the National Register of Historic Places in Kentucky
Prairie School architecture in Kentucky
Railway stations in the United States opened in 1910
National Register of Historic Places in Carter County, Kentucky
Stations along Chesapeake and Ohio Railway lines
Former railway stations in Kentucky
Transportation in Carter County, Kentucky
1910 establishments in Kentucky